Jeong Ho-jeong (born 1 September 1988) is a South Korean football defender. He currently plays for Busan IPark.

Club career

Jeong was one of Seongnam's draft picks for the 2010 K-League season.  Unused for the entire 2010 season, Jeong finally made his professional debut in Seongnam's first group match of the 2011 K-League Cup, against the Pohang Steelers on 16 March 2011.

Club career statistics

References

External links 

1988 births
Living people
Association football defenders
South Korean footballers
Seongnam FC players
Gimcheon Sangmu FC players
Gwangju FC players
Busan IPark players
K League 1 players
K League 2 players